Somerset Live is a website covering news, entertainment and sport in Somerset and nearby areas in Dorset and Wiltshire.  It is owned by Reach plc (formerly Trinity Mirror), with headquarters in Yeovil.

The Somerset Live website moved onto a new platform in March 2017, and subsequently took over the websites of additional regional daily newspapers.

It operates as the website for a number of local newspapers, including:
Bath Chronicle
Blackmore Vale Magazine
Central Somerset Gazette
Cheddar Valley Gazette
Frome Standard and Somerset Guardian
Shepton Mallet Journal
Wells Journal
Western Gazette

References

Newspapers published in Somerset
English websites
British news websites
Newspapers published by Reach plc